Renmin Street Subdistrict  is a subdistrict situated in Yicheng District, Zhumadian, Henan, China. , it administers the following six residential neighborhoods:
Zhongshan Street Community
Fengguang Road South Community
Fengguang Road Central Community
Jiankang Road Community
Jianxin Street Community
Xiangyang Street Community

See also
List of township-level divisions of Henan

References

Township-level divisions of Henan
Zhumadian
Subdistricts of the People's Republic of China